was a village located in Ōno District, Fukui Prefecture, Japan.

As of 2003, the village had an estimated population of 701 and a density of 2.11 persons per km². The total area was 332.38 km².

On November 7, 2005, Izumi was merged into the expanded city of Ōno.

External links
 Ōno official website 

Dissolved municipalities of Fukui Prefecture
Ōno, Fukui